The papillose blenny (Acanthemblemaria chaplain) is a species of chaenopsid blenny found in the western Atlantic ocean. It can reach a maximum length of  TL. The specific name honours the ichthyologist Charles C. G. Chaplin (1906-1991).

References

chaplini
Fauna of the Bahamas
Fish of Cuba
Fish of the Caribbean
Fish of the Dominican Republic
papillose blenny
Taxa named by James Erwin Böhlke